Tête des Fétoules is a mountain in the French Alps.

Mountains of Isère
Mountains of the Alps
Alpine three-thousanders